Cleopatra Humphrey (born 4 November 1988) formerly known by her stage name Mz. Bratt and currently known as Cleo., is an English rapper and neo-soul grime musician.

History
Humphrey was born in Bow, London. Later, she moved to Hainault and started producing her music. Her talent impressed the urban producer Terror Danjah who took her under their wing after hearing her at local MC battles and seeing her Myspace profile. Mz. Bratt was selected to be part of the T4 entertainment show the Musicool, in which she was the lead female, at one point reducing guest judge Jamelia to tears with her exceptional talent and vocal ability. Following this, Mz. Bratt embarked on a US and European tour with The Count & Sinden, which included shows at the Glastonbury Festival and at Bestival.

Humphrey has a mixed race ethnic background.

Music career
Mz. Bratt's first single, "Who Do You Think You Are?", was released on All Around the World Productions on 27 July 2009, and received plays on BBC Radio 1 and BBC Radio 1Xtra. The second single, "I Like You", followed in November, and was also played by Radio 1Xtra.

In February 2010, Mz. Bratt joined a new collective group formed by Wiley called A-List.

She released her third single, "Selecta", in mid-2010, under A-List Music Ltd, produced by Redlight. She is expected to release her first album at the American Airlines Arena in Miami, Florida, in February 2012 alongside the likes of Usher and Nicole Scherzinger.

Mz. Bratt has also appeared on remixes and records with other artists including Wiley, Taio Cruz, Sadie Ama, Dionne Bromfield and Jazmine Sullivan. A remix of Tinchy Stryder's "Game Over" was promoted online in November 2010 under the name "Female Takeover Remix", with the female MCs Ruff Diamondz, Envy, Lioness, Cherri V, Baby Blue, A.Dot, Lady Leshurr, RoXXXan and Mz. Bratt.

Mz. Bratt and Wiley also appeared in Fugative's song "Go Hard".

She recently took part in the MOBO tour and supported Roll Deep on their tour. She is currently supporting Bruno Mars on the UK leg of his tour.

Mz. Bratt supported Example on his winter 2011 tour. Other support came from Fenech-Soler.

In 2015, Bratt announced her professional name would be Cleo.

2012 and album
Mz. Bratt released a video for her upcoming single "Falling Down", on 16 April 2012 on YouTube. The single is officially released on iTunes on 6 May 2012. Bratt has confirmed that she is recording songs for her first studio album, but won't release the album until there's a demand and people want the album. She has so far recorded about 50 tracks, but she only wants 5 tracks to be used on her album. She has also confirmed that she wants features on her songs, but only after she has recorded all of her songs. Mz Bratt has also stated in various interviews that she would love to work with Chris Martin from Coldplay, Labrinth and Wretch 32 on her new album. That album was expected to be released in 2013, but it was never released.

Personal life
Cleo's father was MC Scallywag from the early 1990s acid house sound system Spiral Tribe.

Discography

Extended plays
2015: Beauty For Ashes

Mixtapes
2007: Give It To Em, Vol. 1
2009: Give It To Em, Vol. 2
2011: Elements

Singles

As featured artist

Soundtrack appearances

Filmography
2011 Anuvahood (as Shay)

References

External links
Soundcloud

Living people
1988 births
21st-century Black British women singers
Grime music artists
People from Bow, London
People from Hainault
Rappers from London
Black British women rappers